Shuko Aoyama and Chang Kai-chen were the defending champions, having won the 2012 Ningbo Challenger – Women's doubles, but both players chose not to participate.

Chan Yung-jan and Zhang Shuai won the title, defeating Irina Buryachok and Oksana Kalashnikova in the final, 6–2, 6–1.

Seeds

Draw

References 
 Draw

Ningbo International Women's Tennis Open - Doubles
Ningbo International Women's Tennis Open